This is a list of works by French avant-garde singer Brigitte Fontaine.

Discography

Albums 
13 chansons décadentes et fantasmagoriques, Productions Jacques Canetti, 1966
Brigitte Fontaine est... folle !, Saravah, 1968
Comme à la radio (with Areski Belkacem and the Art Ensemble of Chicago), Saravah, 1969
Brigitte Fontaine, Saravah, 1972
Je ne connais pas cet homme (with Areski Belkacem), Saravah, 1973
L'Incendie (with Areski Belkacem), Byg Records, 1974
Le Bonheur (with Areski Belkacem), Saravah, 1975
Vous et Nous (with Areski Belkacem), Saravah, 1977
Les églantines sont peut-être formidables (with Areski Belkacem), RCA-Saravah, 1980
French corazon, Midi/EMI, 1988
Genre humain, Virgin, 1995
Les Palaces, Virgin, 1997
Kékéland, Virgin, 2001
Rue Saint Louis en l'Île, Virgin, 2004
Libido, Polydor, 2006.
Prohibition, Polydor, 2009
L'un n'empêche pas l'autre, Polydor, 2011
J'ai l'honneur d'être, Universal, 2013
Terre Neuve, Verycords, 2020

Albums with Jacques Higelin 
12 chansons d'avant le déluge, Productions Jacques Canetti, 1966
15 chansons d'avant le déluge, suite et fin, Productions Jacques Canetti, 1976

Compilations 
Morceaux de choix, Virgin, 1999
Plans fixes, Virgin, 2002

Other records/participations

"Le goudron" / "Les beaux animaux", Saravah, 1969
"Quand tous les ghettos brûleront, ça va faire un hit", with Areski Belkacem and Jean-Claude Vannier, Byg Records, 1974
"Les filles d'aujourd'hui", Carrère-Celluloïd, 1984 (other version in Kékéland, 2001)
"Amore 529" in Un Drame Musical Instantané / Opération Blow-up, collective album, 1992
"Supermarket", single, Virgin, 1995
"On ne tue pas son prochain" in Route Manset, collective tribute to Gérard Manset, 1996
"La caravane" (music by Duke Ellington) in Jazz à Saint-Germain, collective album, 1997 (and in Morceaux de choix, 1999)
"Calimero", single with Stereolab, 1998
"Dressing", single, Virgin, 1999 (and in Morceaux de choix, 1999)
"Underture", inédit with Sonic Youth, Virgin, 2000
"Lady Macbeth", inédit with Sonic Youth, Virgin, 2000
"L'Europe", with Bertrand Cantat, in Des visages des figures, album by Noir Désir, 2001
"Comme à la radio" and "J'ai 26 ans" (English versions of the sixties) in Vintage de choix, compilation, Virgin, 2001
"Âme te souvient-il ?" in Avec Léo, collective tribute to Léo Ferré, 2003
"L'Homme à la moto" in L'Hymne à la môme, collective tribute to Édith Piaf, 2003 (and in Rue Saint-Louis en l'île, 2004)
"Fine mouche", with Khan, in Disko-Cabine, collective album, 2005
"Red Light" in Les tremblements s'immobilisent, album by Karkwa, 2005 (and together, on stage, at the festival Les Vieilles Charrues, Carhaix, 2006)
"Partir ou rester", duet with Olivia Ruiz, Polydor, 2007
"La beuglante" in Femme d'extérieur, album by Maya Barsony, 2008
"Bamako" in B, album by Turzi, 2009
"Je Vous Salue Marie" in Jacno Future, collective tribute to Jacno, 2011,

Covered by 
– in studio
Christine Sèvres : "Les dieux sont dingues" in Christine Sèvres, CBS, 1968
Christine Sèvres : "Maman, j'ai peur", "Le beau cancer" and "Comme Rimbaud", CBS, 1970
Aut'Chose : "Comme à la radio" in Vancouver, une nuit comme une autre, CBS, 1975
Étienne Daho : "Dommage que tu sois mort" in Urgence, collective album, Virgin, 1992
Philippe Katerine : "La vache enragée" in Morceaux Choisis by The Recyclers, Rectangle, 1997
Jun Togawa : "Comme à la radio" in "20th Jun Togawa Good-bye 20th Century", God Mountain, 2000
Faun Fables : "Eternal" (English version of "Éternelle") in Family Album, Drag City Records, 2004
Étienne Daho and Jane Birkin : "La grippe" in Rendez-vous by Jane Birkin, EMI Music, 2004
Lucien Francoeur et Aut'Chose : "Comme à la radio" in Chansons d'épouvante, Artic, 2005
Françoise Hardy and Rodolphe Burger : "Cet enfant que je t'avais fait" in Parenthèses by Françoise Hardy, EMI Music, 2006
Matthieu Chedid : "Mister Mystère" in Mister Mystère, 2009
Emmanuelle Seigner : "Quand tu n'es pas là" in Dingue, Columbia, 2010
Stereo Total : "Barbe à papa" in Baby ouh !, 2010
Aurelia : "Vous et nous" in The Hour Of The Wolf, 2010
Johnny Hallyday : "Tanagra" in Jamais seul, 2011
Stefie Shock : "Dévaste-moi" in La Mécanique de l'amour, 2011
Yacht : "Le Goudron", single by Yacht, DFA, 2012
Barbara Carlotti : "Blanche-Neige" in La Fille, 2013

– on stage
Dominique A : "Les étoiles et les cochons"
Arthur H : "Hollywood"
Christophe : "Hollywood"
Pierre Lapointe : "La symphonie pastorale"
Maya Barsony : "Veuve Clicquot"
Matthieu Chedid et Johnny Hallyday : « Tanagra »
Bertrand Cantat : "Les vergers"
Ludivine Sagnier : "Dommage que tu sois mort"

Other original lyrics 
"Toi et ton sax" for Zizi Jeanmaire
"Les Encerclés", "Le Roi de la naphtaline", "Je veux des coupables" and "Rififi" (in Paradis païen, 1998) for Jacques Higelin
"Le brouillard", "Chanson pour sa mère", "À chaque tournant", "Bali", "Le dragon", "Les Borgia", "Les murailles", "La tête bandée", "Un soleil", "Les muzdus", "La vache", "Pif", "Salomé", "Le triomphe de l'amour" (2010) for Areski Belkacem
"Jungle Pulse" and "Toi, Jamais Toujours" for Étienne Daho (in Reserection, 1995, and L'Invitation, 2007)
"Barbares attraits" (in Toi du monde, 2000) and "Péplum" (in Fais moi une fleur, 2011) for Maurane
"Irrésistiblement" for Vanessa Paradis (in Divinidylle, 2007)
"La beuglante" for Maya Barsony
"Le solitaire" for Juliette Gréco (in Je me souviens de tout, 2009)
"Phébus", "Tanagra", "Destroy", "Lettre à Tanagra", "Brigand", "Crise" and "Je les adore" for Matthieu Chedid (in Mister Mystère, Barclay, 2009) 
"Elle est SM" for Axel Bauer (in Peaux de serpent, 2013)

Books 
Chroniques du bonheur, éditions des femmes, 1975
Madelon : Alchimie et prêt-à-porter, récit, éditions Seghers, 1979
L'Inconciliabule, éditions Tierce, 1980, and éditions Belles Lettres-Archimbaud, 2009
Paso doble, novel, éditions Flammarion, 1985
Nouvelles de l'exil, éditions Imprimerie nationale, 1988, and éditions Flammarion, 2006
Genre humain, Christian Pirot éditeur, 1996
La Limonade bleue, novel, l’Écarlate, 1997
Galerie d'art à Kekeland, portrait gallery, éditions Flammarion, 2002
La Bête Curieuse, novel, éditions Flammarion, 2005
Attends-moi sous l'obélisque, éditions Seuil-Archimbaud, 2006
Travellings, novel, éditions Flammarion, 2008
Rien suivi de Colère noire, éditions Belles Lettres-Archimbaud, 2009
Contes de chats, with Jean-Jacques Sempé, éditions Belles Lettres-Archimbaud, 2009
Le bon peuple du sang, éditions Flammarion, 2010
Mot pour mot, éditions Belles Lettres-Archimbaud, 2011
Antonio, éditions Belles Lettres-Archimbaud, 2011
Le bal des coquettes sales (with Léïla Derradji), éditions Belles Lettres-Archimbaud, 2011
Les Charmeurs de pierres, éditions Flammarion, 2012
Portrait de l'artiste en déshabillé de soie, Actes Sud, 2012
Les hommes préfèrent les hommes – histoires, Flammarion, 2014
Un vitrail de plus, Riveneuve, 2015

Theater 
Maman j'ai peur (with Jacques Higelin and Rufus), Studio des Champs-Elysées, 1966
Niok, partially improvised show (with Jacques Higelin and Areski Belkacem), Théâtre du Lucernaire, 1969
Encore, encore et encore, 1969
Les enfants sont tous fous (with Rufus), 1969
Acte 2, adaptation of L'Inconciliabule, 1980
Les marraines de Dieu (with Léïla Derradji), 1986
Antonio, 1990
Coup de sang à Fougères (with Thierry Brout), 1993
Montana-split (with Thierry Brout), 1994
L'Inconciliabule, Théâtre de Morlaix, 2011 (show canceled)

Cinema 
Le Grand Soir (Benoît Delépine and Gustave Kervern, 2012) 
Brigitte Fontaine, reflets et crudité (Benoît Mouchart and Thomas Bartel, 2013) : herself

Radio 
Les Jeux olympiques de l'orgasme (with Léïla Derradji), 1983

References 

Discographies of French artists
Rock music discographies